Events from the year 1754 in Ireland.

Incumbent
Monarch: George II

Events
6 March – Thomas Dillon, Richard Ferrall and Co.'s bank failure in Dublin due to fraud, the first of three (1754–1755); the partners abscond to France.
County of Meath Infirmary established at Navan.

Arts and literature
2 March – riot at Smock Alley Theatre in Dublin. Thomas Sheridan, the manager, resigns, and leaves Ireland on 15 September.

Births
15 January – Richard Martin, "Humanity Dick", politician and animal rights activist (died 1834)
7 May – Adam Averell, Primitive Wesleyan cleric (died 1847)
23 May – William Drennan, physician, poet, educationalist and co-founder of the Society of United Irishmen (died 1820)
14 July – Robert Ward, politician (died 1831)
25 August – Charles Coote, 2nd Baron Castle Coote, politician (died 1823)
9 December – Francis Rawdon, politician and military officer (died 1826 at sea)
Cornelius Heeney, merchant and politician in America (died 1848)
Patrick O'Kelly, poet and eccentric (died 1835)
Approximate date – Andrew Todd, fur trader in North America (died 1796)

Deaths
2 January – William James Conolly, politician.
16 April –  Donal O'Sullivan of Dunkerron Castle, County Kerry.
John K'Eogh, cleric and natural historian (born c.1681)
Seán Clárach Mac Domhnaill, poet (born 1691)

References

 
Years of the 18th century in Ireland
Ireland
1750s in Ireland